is a railway station on the Meitetsu Hiromi Line in the city of Kani, Gifu, Japan, operated by the private railway operator Meitetsu.

Lines
It is 12.2 kilometers from the starting point of the line at Inuyama.

Station layout
The station has two opposed ground-level side platforms, connected by a level crossing. The station is unattended.

Platforms

Adjacent stations

History
It was renamed Nihonrain-imawatari Station on November 10, 1969.

References

External links

  

Stations of Nagoya Railroad
Railway stations in Gifu Prefecture
Railway stations in Japan opened in 1925
Kani, Gifu